A Man of Quality is a 1926 American silent crime film directed by Wesley Ruggles and starring George Walsh, Ruth Dwyer and Brian Donlevy. The survival status of the film is unknown.

Cast
 George Walsh as Jack Banning 
 Ruth Dwyer as Marion Marcy 
 Brian Donlevy as Richard Courtney 
 Lucien Prival as Spanish Joe 
 Laura De Cardi as Dorina

References

Bibliography
 Munden, Kenneth White. The American Film Institute Catalog of Motion Pictures Produced in the United States, Part 1. University of California Press, 1997.

External links

1926 films
1926 crime films
American crime films
Films directed by Wesley Ruggles
American silent feature films
American black-and-white films
1920s English-language films
1920s American films
Silent crime films